Blatter is a surname. Notable people with the surname include:

 Ethelbert Blatter (1877–1934), Swiss Jesuit priest and botanist
 Heinz Blatter (born 1971), Swiss ski mountaineer
 Sepp Blatter (born 1936), former president of FIFA
 Silvio Blatter (born 1946), Swiss writer